Zophodia pectinatella is a species of snout moth in the genus Zophodia. It was described by George Hampson in 1901. It is found in Mexico.

References

Moths described in 1901
Phycitini